Ampullaceana is a genus of gastropods belonging to the family Lymnaeidae.

The species of this genus are found in Eurasia.

Species:

Ampullaceana ampla 
Ampullaceana balthica 
Ampullaceana dipkunensis 
Ampullaceana fontinalis 
Ampullaceana intermedia 
Ampullaceana lagotis 
Ampullaceana relicta

References

Lymnaeidae